R. polymorpha may refer to:

 Ramalina polymorpha, a strap lichen
 Rhamnus polymorpha, a flowering plant
 Richterago polymorpha, a Brazilian sunflower